The 2022 season of The Hundred was the second season of The Hundred, a professional franchise 100-ball cricket tournament involving eight men's and women's teams located in major cities across England and Wales.

The competition returned after its first season, which was impacted by the COVID-19 pandemic and faced strong opposition from traditional cricket fans. Despite this more than 500,000 tickets were sold for the first year of the competition and the contest was seen as a major boost for the women's game.

The Hundred's organisers hoped that more overseas players would be able to take part in this second season due to the relaxation of lockdown restrictions as the pandemic receded. 

Salaries for male players increased by 25% on the previous year, with each team allowed to spend up to £1m on wages for the month-long contest. Pay for female players have been more than doubled on the previous year, with each team given £250,000 to spend on salaries.

Teams

The eight teams that competed in the 2021 season returned for a second year. They were all franchises, operating separately from the existing county cricket clubs, with each representing a large area of England and Wales.

Tournament structure
In the inaugural competition in 2021, eight city-based teams competed for the men's and women's titles over a month between 21 July and 21 August 2021.

For 2022, the same eight city-based teams competed over 56 matches in the group stage (32 men's, 24 women's). The majority of the men's and women's matches were held on the same day at the same grounds, with one ticket giving access to both contests.

Each men's team played four matches at home and four matches away. This included one match against every other side in the competition and then a bonus match against their nearest regional rivals.

The women's competition was curtailed due to the inclusion of women's cricket at the 2022 Commonwealth Games in Birmingham, reducing the number of players who were available for the start of the contest. As a result, the women's contest started a week later and each women's team only played six matches in the group stage, meaning some sides did not meet each other at that point in the competition.

Once the league stage was completed the top three teams competed in the knockout stage to decide the ultimate champions. The second and third teams met in a semi-final at the Rose Bowl in Southampton. The winner of the semi-final then met the team that finished top of the league in the final at Lord's.

Squads
Men's teams were allowed to retain up to ten of the previous season's men's players by negotiating new contracts directly with players until the retention window closed in February. In addition, all England centrally contracted players were retained by their respective franchises. James Anderson and Stuart Broad were the only two Test-contracted players not to be allocated a franchise.

A player draft then took place on 6 April to fill the forty-two remaining squad players, with teams taking turns to sign available players in vacant salary bands. Picks were in reverse order of where a side finished in the previous season, beginning with London Spirit and ending with Southern Brave. Each side was given a 'Right to Match', allowing them to retain one further player from their 2021 squad if they match the bid of another franchise at the draft.

Following the draft, sides had two wildcard picks immediately prior to the tournament. The Vitality Wildcard allows one domestic player who impressed in the 2022 T20 Blast, while the Overseas Wildcard allows one further overseas player to be selected.

In the women's competition, an unlimited number of players could be retained from the previous year's competition. There was not a draft in the women's competition and instead teams could recruit players from around the world until the end of June, providing they did not break their overall salary cap.

Broadcasting
Sky Sports showed every match in the competition live on its subscription television service, while the BBC also broadcast some matches live on free-to-air television and broadcast commentary on its radio services. Some of the games shown on Sky were simulcast on YouTube and TikTok.

Standings

Women

 advanced to Final
 advanced to the Eliminator

Men

 advanced to Final
 advanced to the Eliminator

Group fixtures (Men)

Group fixtures (Women)
The following sides did not play each other in the group stage, due to the shortened women's competition: Oval Invincibles and Welsh Fire, Northern Superchargers and Trent Rockets, London Spirit and Manchester Originals, Southern Brave and Birmingham Phoenix.

Knockout stages

Women

Eliminator

Final

Men

Eliminator

Final

Statistics

Most runs

Women

Men

Most wickets

Women

Men

See also
 T20 Blast
 Royal London One-Day Cup

Notes

References

External links
Official website
Women's Series home at ESPN Cricinfo
Men's Series home at ESPN Cricinfo

The Hundred (cricket)
English domestic cricket competitions
Professional sports leagues in England
Professional sports leagues in the United Kingdom
2022 in English cricket
2022 in English women's cricket